Gelnica is a town in the Košice Region of Eastern Slovakia. It has a population of 6,076.

Names
The name comes from the name of the river Hnilec  derived from Slavic word hnilý (rotten). The initial g in the German form Göllnitz indicates that the name was adopted by Germans before the spirantisation of Slavic g to  h in Slovak (around the 12th century). The current Slovak name Gelnica comes from this secondary German form. The Hungarian Gölnicbánya (bánya – mine) refers to the town's mining activity.

Geography
It is located in the northern part of the Slovak Ore Mountains, in the Hnilec river valley, which flows a few kilometres downstream into Hornád.

History
Carpathian Germans chiefly from Bavaria began to settle the formerly Slavic settlement during the 13th century.  By 1264 it was an established mining town and became a royal mining town of the Kingdom of Hungary by 1276, from where the first mentioned is recorded (as "Gelnic"). For many years Gelnica was a chief mining town in Szepes County of the Kingdom of Hungary. Silver, copper, but also gold, quicksilver, lead and iron ore were mined in the mines. Between 1465–1520, Gelnica lost most of its privileges. The town's population in the second half of the 16th century is estimated at 1000 people, whereby the ratio of Germans and Slovaks, who were the main ethnic groups, is estimated to have been 3:1. In 1910, the town's population of 3833 inhabitants consisted of 2095 Germans, 1098 Slovaks and 606 Hungarians. The German population was expelled in 1945.

Sights
The town includes the ruins of a medieval castle, destroyed by a fire in 1685. Other attractions include a Gothic church and Renaissance town hall, both remodelled along Baroque lines, and a mining museum.

Demographics
According to the 2001 census, the town had 6,404 inhabitants. 95.92% of inhabitants were Slovaks, 1.55% Roma, 0.84% Germans and 1.02% Czechs. The religious makeup was 72.00% Roman Catholics, 15.88% people with no religious affiliation, and 4.03% Lutherans and 3.28 Greek Catholics.

Twin towns — sister cities

Gelnica is twinned with:

 Horní Suchá, Czech Republic
 Gennep, Netherlands
 Rudnik nad Sanem, Poland
 Le Pradet, France
 Novodnistrovsk, Ukraine

See also
 List of municipalities and towns in Slovakia

References

External links
 Town website 
Surnames of living people in Gelnica

Cities and towns in Slovakia
Spiš
Geography of Košice Region